DWPR (1296 AM) Radyo Pilipino is a radio station owned and operated by Radyo Pilipino Media Group through its licensee Beacon Communications System, Inc. The station's studio is located along Gonzales St., Brgy. Bonuan Boquig, Dagupan, and its transmitter is located in Brgy. Bolosan, Dagupan.

It was formerly owned by Allied Broadcasting Center from its inauguration until 1983, when the Radio Corporation of the Philippines acquired the station. It is one of the Radyo Pilipino stations affiliated with the Radio Mindanao Network, together with DZLT in Lucena and DXOC in Ozamiz.

References

Radio stations in Dagupan
Radio stations established in 1973
News and talk radio stations in the Philippines